Sheep and goats are both small ruminants with cosmopolitan distributions due to their being kept historically and in modern times as grazers both individually and in herds in return for their production of milk, wool, and meat. As such, the diseases of these animals are of great economic importance to humans.

Prion diseases
scrapie

Viral diseases
Diseases caused by viruses include:
Akabane virus infection
bluetongue disease
border disease (hairy shaker disease)
Cache Valley virus infection
caprine arthritis encephalitis (CAE)
enzootic nasal adenocarcinoma
foot-and-mouth disease
mastitis
Nairobi sheep disease orthonairovirus (NSDV) infection
orf, also known as contagious ecthyma, contagious pustular dermatitis, infectious labial dermatitis, thistle disease, sore mouth, or scabby mouth
ovine encephalomyelitis (louping ill)
ovine progressive pneumonia (OPP)
ovine pulmonary adenocarcinoma
ovine rinderpest, also known as peste des petits ruminants (PPR)
Rift Valley fever
Schmallenberg virus infection
ulcerative dermatosis
variola caprina (goatpox)
variola ovina (sheeppox)
Wesselsbron virus infection

Bacterial diseases
Diseases caused by bacteria include:
anaplasmosis
blackleg
braxy
brucellosis
caseous lymphadenitis
chlamydiosis, also known as enzootic abortion of ewes (EAE)
contagious caprine pleuropneumonia
dermatophilosis, also known as cutaneous streptothricosis, rainscald, rain rot, lumpy wool, or strawberry footrot
ehrlichiosis
enterotoxemia
enzootic posthitis and vulvitis, also known as sheath rot, pizzle rot, or enzootic balanoposthitis
foot rot
infectious necrotic hepatitis
leptospirosis
listeriosis
mastitis
mycoplasmosis
paratuberculosis (Johne's disease)
pasteurellosis
Q fever
salmonellosis
tularemia
ulcerative balanoposthitis and vulvitis, also known as necrotic balanoposthitis/vulvitis, pizzle disease, knobrot, or peestersiekte
vibriosis.

Fungal diseases

Diseases caused by funguses include
candidiasis
cryptococcosis
facial eczema
fungal placentitis
sporotrichosis
zygomycosis

Parasitic diseases
Parasites causing disease in sheep and goats include diseases caused by protozoa, helminths, tapeworms and roundworms.

Protozoa
Babesia species
Cryptosporidium parvum
Eimeria species
Giardia intestinalis
Neospora caninum
Sarcocystis species
Theileria lestoquardi (hirsi)
Toxoplasma gondii
Trypanosoma species

Helminths

Flatworms
Dicrocoelium dendriticum
Fasciola hepatica
Fasciola gigantica
Fascioloides magna
Schistosoma bovis

Tapeworms

Echinococcus granulosus
Moniezia species
Taenia ovis
Taenia hydatigena

Roundworms
Chabertia ovina
Dictyocaulus filaria
Elaeophora schneideri
Haemonchus contortus
Cooperia species
Muellerius capillaris
Nematodirus species
Neostrongylus linearis
Oesophagostomum species
parasitic bronchitis, also known as "hoose"
Protostrongylus refescens
Teladorsagia circumcincta
Trichostrongylus species
Trichuris ovis

Arachnids and insects

Ticks
Amblyomma species
Boophilus species
Dermacentor species
Haemaphysalis species
Hyalomma species
Ixodes species
Rhipicephalus species

Mites (mange)
Chorioptes bovis
Demodex ovis
Demodex caprae
Psorobia ovis
Psoroptes ovis
Sarcoptes scabiei var. caprae
Sarcoptes scabiei var. ovis

Lice 
chewing lice
Damalinia caprae (goats)
Damalinia crassipes (goats)
Damalinia limbata (goats)
Damalinia ovis (sheep)
sucking lice
Linognathus africanus (sheep and goats)
Linognathus ovillus (sheep)
Linognathus pedalis (sheep)
Linognathus stenopsis (goats)

Flies
mosquitoes
Aedes species
Anopheles species
Culex species
myiasis
fly strike
Chrysomya species
Lucilia species
Oestrus ovis (sheep bot fly)
sheep ked (Melophagus ovinus)

References